Albert Victor Adamson (January 4, 1890 – November 9, 1972) was a New Zealand director, producer, screenwriter, and actor most famous for directing and starring in B and Z grade westerns in the early days of motion pictures. Adamson often used pseudonyms to credit himself, most often using the name Denver Dixon. His son, Al Adamson, would later follow his father in producing B movies during the 1960s and 1970s.

Biography

Adamson was born January 4, 1890, in Auckland, New Zealand. In the late 1910s, he moved to the United States with a home-produced movie and found a distributor. He continued making his own movies despite a lack of early success with his films.

Adamson began producing films around 1920. He called his production company Art Mix Productions and named himself the star. Adamson, however, found himself increasingly drawn to work behind the camera. He hired actor George Kesterson to act in his films using the Art Mix moniker, a name that Kesterson used for the rest of his career.

With the advent of talking pictures, Adamson produced a series of Z-grade westerns featuring actors from the silent age in the decline of their careers, including Buffalo Bill, Jr., Wally Wales and Buddy Roosevelt. Many of these films were released by Superior Talking Pictures, a small independent distributor. Adamson's productions were of such low quality that the opening credits were often not proofread, leading to typographical errors such as in the case of the Buffalo Bill, Jr. film Lightning Bill, which was spelled Lighting Bill on the title card.

Adamson's company, Victor Adamson Productions, built studios in Monrovia, California, in 1927. Opening and dedication ceremonies for the facilities occurred on July 17, 1927.

In 1936 Adamson attempted to turn a young stuntman, Wally West, into a star using the name Tom Wynn. Adamson himself co-starred in the resulting film, Desert Mesa, using the pseudonym Art James. He was not able to find many companies willing to buy the film due to its poor quality. Adamson would star in one additional film after Desert Mesa, 1938's Mormon Conquest.

Following Mormon Conquest Adamson appeared in many films, mostly Westerns and mostly in bit parts, through the late 1930s and 1940s. Often credited as "Denver Dixon", he appeared in approximately 130 films during this period. In 1952 he appeared as a barfly in an uncredited role in Bend in the River starring Jimmy Stewart. After a career hiatus, he briefly returned to filmmaking when he produced two horror films with son Al Adamson, Halfway to Hell (1961) and Two Tickets to Terror (1963). These films inspired the younger Adamson to produce B movies of his own, which he did from the 1960s through the early 1980s.

Death
Adamson died of a heart attack on November 9, 1972, in Los Angeles, aged 82.

References

External links
 

1890 births
1972 deaths
American film directors
Western (genre) film directors
Male Western (genre) film actors
American male film actors
20th-century American male actors
New Zealand emigrants to the United States